Martin State Airport  is a joint civil-military public use airport located nine nautical miles (10 mi, 17 km) east of the central business district of Baltimore, in Baltimore County, Maryland, United States. The facility is located within the census-designated place of Middle River on Maryland State Highway 150 (Eastern Boulevard), near the intersection of Maryland State Highway 700 (Martin Boulevard). The Maryland Aviation Administration operates the airport on behalf of the Maryland Department of Transportation. MTN is a general aviation relief airport.

History
This was the former plant airport for the Glenn L. Martin Company which produced a large number of military aircraft at this location between the 1920s and 1960s. The Glenn L. Martin Maryland Aviation Museum and old seaplane ramps are located at the southeast corner of the airport.

In 1937, Glen Martin proposed height restrictions around the airport because a new generation of large, heavy transports would be flying from its seaplane base. By 1945, Martin had built $5.5 million in structures on the field. The company attempted to sell the property to the City of Baltimore for $1 million, but the commissioner Robert O'Boneell said there was insufficient room for expansion. In 1974, Governor Marvin Mandel proposed to purchase the airport from Martin Marietta. The company formed a real-estate arm, Chesapeake Park Inc., with the former Baltimore County Council Chair Herry J. Bartenfelder to build residential and commercial real estate. Citizens of Essex opposed the use conversion, lending support to the State's purchase of the field for $9.4 million. In 1980, Port-A-Port T-Hangars were purchased for general aviation use and lease. In the 1990s the airport was targeted as part of the Middle River Employment Center district to have MD route 43 highway extended from I-95 direct to the terminal through a series of wetland parcels.

Military use
The Maryland Air National Guard's 175th Wing is a tenant activity at MTN with locally based A-10C aircraft.  The Air National Guard facility is located on the northeast side of the field and is officially named Warfield Air National Guard Base.

Facilities and aircraft 
It has one asphalt paved runway designated 15/33 which is 6,997 by 180 feet (2,132 x 55 m). It also had one helipad with a 65 by 65 ft (20 x 20 m) concrete surface.

For the 12-month period ending October 6, 2010, the airport had 69,193 aircraft operations, an average of 189 per day: 91% general aviation, 6% military, and 3% air taxi. At that time there were 218 aircraft based at this airport: 64% single-engine, 14% multi-engine, 6% jet, 5% helicopter and 11% military.

Operations 
Martin State Airport serves a wide variety of general aviation and commercial operators. Martin State is home base to many helicopter operations including local news helicopters WJZ Channel 13 and WBAL Channel 11; Medevac services Express Care 1 and Helicopter Transport Services; and the aviation units for the Maryland State Police, Baltimore County Police, and the Baltimore City Police.

There is a wide variety of flight training activities at the airport's three flight schools: Middle River Aviation, First Class Flight Academy, and Brett Aviation.

Cargo operations

See also 

 Martin State Airport (MARC station)
 175th Wing

References

External links 
 Martin State Airport
 Martin Airport on Google Street View
 Aerial photo as of 8 April 1994 from USGS The National Map
 
 

Airports in Maryland
Transportation buildings and structures in Baltimore County, Maryland